Highfield may refer to:

Places
Places in England
Highfield, Bolton
Highfield, Derbyshire
Highfield, Gloucestershire
Highfield, Southampton
Highfield, Hertfordshire a neighbourhood in Hemel Hempstead
Highfield, Oxfordshire
Highfield, Sheffield
Highfield, Tyne & Wear
Highfield, Wigan 
Highfield, North Yorkshire
Highfield Boarding House, Uppingham School

Places in Northern Ireland
Highfield, Belfast

Places in Scotland
Highfield, North Ayrshire

Places in United States of America
Highfield-Cascade, Maryland

Places in Zimbabwe
Highfield, Harare

Places in New Zealand
Highfield, New Zealand

Other uses
Highfield (surname)
Highfield (Birmingham) - focus of a notable literary scene in the 1930s
Highfield Leadership Academy, a secondary school in Blackpool, England
Highfield Road, a former association football stadium in Coventry, England
The Highfield School, a secondary school in Letchworth, England
Highfield (stadium) - a former home stadium of The Wednesday F.C., probably the site of the present Highfield library, Sheffield
London Highfield, a rugby league team